Higford may refer to:

Higford, Shropshire, a small settlement in Shopshire, England
John Higford, a former English politician
Robert Higford, a former English politician
Daniel Higford Davall Burr, a former English politician